Els Cornadors is a mountain range in Majorca in the municipality of Sóller.

Landforms of Mallorca
Sóller
Mountain ranges of the Balearic Islands

3,136-ft. island mountain with corner-shaped twin peaks & dramatic landscape.